Gem Lake is a city in Ramsey County, Minnesota, United States. The population was 528 at the 2020 census.

Geography
Highway 61 serves as a main route. Nearby places include White Bear Lake, Maplewood, Little Canada, and Vadnais Heights.

Demographics

2010 census
As of the census of 2010, there were 393 people, 155 households, and 115 families living in the city. The racial makeup of the city was 93.1% White, 5.1% Asian, 1.0% from other races, and 0.8% from two or more races. Hispanic or Latino of any race were 2.5% of the population.

There were 155 households, of which 27.1% had children under the age of 18 living with them, 64.5% were married couples living together, 5.8% had a female householder with no husband present, 3.9% had a male householder with no wife present, and 25.8% were non-families. 20.0% of all households were made up of individuals, and 11.6% had someone living alone who was 65 years of age or older. The average household size was 2.54 and the average family size was 2.94.

The median age in the city was 49.5 years. 19.6% of residents were under the age of 18; 6.1% were between the ages of 18 and 24; 17% were from 25 to 44; 42.5% were from 45 to 64; and 14.8% were 65 years of age or older. The gender makeup of the city was 52.7% male and 47.3% female.

2000 census
As of the census of 2000, there were 419 people, 139 households, and 111 families living in the city. The racial makeup of the city was 93.79% White, 1.19% African American, 2.63% Asian, 0.72% from other races, and 1.67% from two or more races.

There were 139 households, out of which 44.6% had children under the age of 18 living with them, 66.9% were married couples living together, 8.6% had a female householder with no husband present, and 20.1% were non-families. 18.7% of all households were made up of individuals, and 8.6% had someone living alone who was 65 years of age or older.  The average household size was 3.01 and the average family size was 3.40.

In the city, the population was spread out, with 30.3% under the age of 18, 6.9% from 18 to 24, 28.4% from 25 to 44, 23.4% from 45 to 64, and 11.0% who were 65 years of age or older.  The median age was 38 years. For every 100 females, there were 98.6 males.  For every 100 females age 18 and over, there were 98.6 males.

The median income for a household in the city was $64,167, and the median income for a family was $82,909. Males had a median income of $39,583 versus $28,000 for females. The per capita income for the city was $28,750.  About 1.8% of families and 5.9% of the population were below the poverty line, including 4.3% of those under age 18 and none of those age 65 or over.

References

External links
  Official Gem Lake Website

Cities in Minnesota
Cities in Ramsey County, Minnesota